Petralia is a genus of bryozoans belonging to the family Petraliidae.

The species of this genus are found in Australia, Malesia, North America.

Species:

Petralia ingens 
Petralia livingstonei 
Petralia mucropora 
Petralia undata

References

Bryozoan genera